The East Coast railway line (ECRL) is the single track metre gauge runs between Gemas railway station, in Negeri Sembilan and Tumpat railway station, in Kelantan of Malaysia. Gemas is the rail junction between the West Coast line and East Coast railway line. Like the West Coast railway line, it is called the East Coast railway line (Malaysia) because it serves two of Peninsular Malaysia's East Coast states, namely Pahang and Kelantan. In fact, it does not run along the coast at all and only meets the South China Sea when it terminates in Tumpat railway station. It runs through the interior, often through deep jungle, thus earning the nickname Jungle Railway. Terengganu is the only state in Peninsular Malaysia not served by the KTM railway network. The East Coast Rail Link is planned to have an interchange with the ECRL at Mentakab and expand the railway network to the cities, such as Kuantan and Kuala Terengganu, in the East Coast.

History 
The East Coast rail line was discontinued due to floods which struck the east coast on 22 December 2014, causing extensive damage to the track infrastructure, signage equipment as well as track maintenance machinery which was submerged in water. In August 2020, Malaysian transport minister Datuk Seri Dr Wee Ka Siong said the government had allocated RM874.7m to upgrade track infrastructure and trains at the east coast sector and the railway should resume service by 2021.

On 12 April 2021, KTMB launched its KTM Class 61 Diesel Multiple Unit (DMU) trains for the east coast route between Kelantan and Pahang. Transport Minister Datuk Seri Dr Wee Ka Siong said the DMU trains were being introduced specifically to replace KTM’s conventional diesel trains for the KTM Intercity East Coast rail link between Tumpat and Kuala Lipis. He claimed the new DMU will reduce travel time as the average speed of the train is about 100kph, compared to the conventional trains that run between 50kph and 60kph. The DMU trains, covering 216km from Tumpat and Gua Musang and 94km from Gua Musang to Kuala Lipis, would be fully operational in stages. The Tumpat-Gua Musang-Kuala Lipis route represents the first phase of the upgrading process. The second phase will cover routes to Gemas, Negri Sembilan, while the third phase will cover the Gua Musang-Mentakab stretch along the Pahang route.

Services 
The East Coast railway line is served by a following:
 
 between Tumpat and JB Sentral.
The route between Gemas and JB Sentral is part of the West Coast Line while the route between Gemas and Tumpat is on the East Coast Line)
 (stops at all stations and halts)
Between  and 
Between  and 
Between  and 
Between  and 
Between  and

Line network

Main line

Rantau Panjang line

See also
 KTM West Coast railway line

References

Further reading

External links

Jungle Railway in Malaysia – The best train times and most scenic sections

Railway lines in Malaysia
Metre gauge railways in Malaysia
Keretapi Tanah Melayu